Baggage is a British television game show based on the American programme of the same name. The series, hosted by Gok Wan, premiered on Channel 4 on 21 September 2012.

Gameplay
Similar to the American version, the series features three single contestants who reveal secrets about themselves to a central prospective dater, who eliminates contestants with the baggage he or she deems most unbearable. Once the contestants are narrowed down to one, the main contestant must reveal a secret of his or her own.

Production
Channel 4 ordered a series pilot on 23 February 2012; Wan was announced as host on 5 July 2012.

Reception
Kevin O'Sullivan of Daily Mirror gave the series a negative review, calling it "atrocious" and a "barrel-scraping programme that’s fun for none of the family."

References

External links

2012 British television series debuts
2012 British television series endings
2010s British game shows
Channel 4 game shows
English-language television shows